Pak Chun-hong (died  January 2014) was a North Korean Central Committee of the Workers' Party of Korea politician who was reportedly purged with Jang Song-thaek and his associates.

Career

Pak Chu-hong was an official of the Central Committee of the Workers' Party of Korea. According to South Korean media he had held the post of Deputy Director of the Korean Workers' Party Administration Department. Pak was involved with the Ministry of People's Security. Consequently, he made multiple appearances at leader Kim Jong-un's on-site visits.

Pak was among the closest associates of Jang Song-thaek. For instance, he accompanied Jang on a field guidance tour led by Kim Jong-un. They inspected Okryu Children's Hospital.

Purge

According to a report distributed to overseas diplomatic missions of North Korea, the 16 closest associates of Jang were executed. The list included Pak Chun-hong's name. The report stated that he was executed for showing "disloyalty to First Chairman of the National Defense Commission Kim Jong-un". However, the report had not been independently verified.

Pak was reported to have been purged at the time of Ryang Chong-song's purge, as both were censored from articles available at Uriminzokkiri website.

See also

Kim Kyong-hui

References

External links
List of people purged with Jang Song-thaek  

2014 deaths
Workers' Party of Korea politicians
People executed for treason against North Korea
Executed politicians
Purges in North Korea
21st-century executions by North Korea
Executed North Korean people
Date of birth unknown